The 1924 Grand National was the 83rd renewal of the world-famous Grand National horse race that took place at Aintree Racecourse near Liverpool, England, on 28 March 1924.

A false start caused the race to be delayed by around eight minutes. 1924 was the last year the Grand National would be started from a general riding start, with the now-familiar 'tape' introduced at the line the following year.

Winnal gained an advantage of 20 lengths by the Canal Turn on the second circuit, when he was hampered by a loose horse and refused.

The race was won by Master Robert, a 25/1 shot ridden by jockey Bob Trudgill and trained by Aubrey Hastings for owner Lord Airlie, who collected the £5,000 prize for the winner.

Fly Mask finished in second place, Silvo in third and Drifter fourth. Thirty horses ran and all returned safely to the stables.

Forty-five cameramen were deployed to capture the race on film, the most to have ever gone to record a sporting event at the time. Also in attendance at Aintree was King George V.

Post race celebrations took place at Liverpool's Adelphi Hotel where winning rider, Bob Trudgill treated Lord Airlie's 1,500 guests to a re-enactment of his victory by leaping a Becher's Brook made out of 20 Magnums of Champagne

Finishing Order

Non-finishers

References

 1924
Grand National
Grand National
20th century in Lancashire